Camille LeNoir (born September 1, 1986) is a former professional basketball player. She played college basketball at University of Southern California (USC).

High school
LeNoir attended Narbonne High School. In 2014, she had her jersey retired by the school.

College statistics

Personal life
LeNoir graduated from USC with a B.A. in Sociology. In 2010 she co-founded True Point Guard (a basketball training company) with sports psychologist Robben Sprague. .

References

External links
USC Trojans bio

1986 births
Living people
American women's basketball players
Basketball players from California
Guards (basketball)
People from Inglewood, California
USC Trojans women's basketball players
Washington Mystics draft picks